Esther Muthoni Passaris OGW (born 20 October 1964) is a Kenyan politician, social entrepreneur and philanthropist. She is the Nairobi County woman representative in the bicameral Kenyan parliament, and a member of the Orange Democratic Movement (ODM) Political Party.

In 2013, she ran for member of parliament for women's representative for Nairobi County, on the Kenya National Congress political party ticket, but lost to Rachel Shebesh. She is a female public figure in Kenyan business and politics.

Early life
Passaris was born in the coastal city of Mombasa to a Greek father and a Kenyan Kikuyu mother. She attended the Aga Khan Academies for her primary and secondary education. She enrolled in the Advanced Management Program course at Strathmore Business School, a program that was conducted in December 2006 between Strathmore University and the University of Navarra. She also has a Diploma in Law from the University of London. In October 2017, Passaris graduated from the United States International University Africa, in Nairobi, with a BSc International Business Administration.

Public and political career 

Esther Passaris is a public figure in Kenya, who has sparked some controversy by her statements about other Kenyan politicians and businessmen. She has been a runner-up in Miss Kenya contest and is actively campaigning for the rights of women in Kenya.

Through her Adopt a Light organization, Passaris has signed a deal with Nairobi city authorities in order to: "Restore decrepit street lighting in exchange for advertising rights on the lamp posts."

Passaris ran for the women's representative for Nairobi County during the 2013 Kenyan general election, and was also a candidate for the post of Mayor of Nairobi. She is currently the Nairobi Women's Representative.

Esther speaks about the community and human rights. This makes her spend time with the community, doing mentorship programs and speaking engagements in social forums like Fatuma's Voice. She was also CEO and the founder of "One in a Million" campaign which was operating under Driving Kenya Forward, a non-profit charitable organization, aimed at fighting development challenges in Kenya, such as poverty and unemployment, and promoting urban and rural development.

She was re-elected in the 2022 general election. She dedicated her victory to her late father.

Personal life
Passaris has two children with Kenyan businessman Pius Ngugi. In 2003, she filed a lawsuit against Ngugi for a breach of promise to marry, demanding a monthly allowance of KSh.  (US$2,000), and a car to take their children to and from school. In August 2011, Passaris was sued by Ngugi, claiming she continued to demand more money despite agreeing to a truce in their previous case. Passaris' daughter and eldest child, Makenna Ngugi, is a singer.

Awards
2016 Most influential women in business and government by CEO Global, South Africa 
2009 UN Habitat Business Awards by UN Habitat
2008 Order of Grand Warrior (OGW) by former President of Kenya, Mwai Kibaki.

References

External links 
 

1964 births
Living people
People from Mombasa
Kikuyu people
Kenyan people of Greek descent
Kenya National Congress politicians
Strathmore University alumni
Alumni of the University of London
United States International University alumni
Orange Democratic Movement politicians
21st-century Kenyan women politicians
21st-century Kenyan politicians
Members of the 12th Parliament of Kenya
Members of the 13th Parliament of Kenya